The Swedish alphabet is a basic element of the Latin writing system used for the Swedish language. The 29 letters of this alphabet are the modern 26-letter basic Latin alphabet (A to Z) plus Å, Ä, and Ö, in that order. It contains 20 consonants and 9 vowels (a e i o u y å ä ö). The Latin alphabet was brought to Sweden along with the Christianization of the population, although runes continued in use throughout the first centuries of Christianity, even for ecclesiastic purposes, despite their traditional relation to the Old Norse religion. The runes underwent partial "latinization" in the Middle Ages, when the Latin alphabet was completely accepted as the Swedish script system, but runes still occurred, especially in the countryside, until the 18th century, and were used decoratively until mid 19th century. Popular literacy is thought to have been higher (nearly universal) with the simplified Younger Futhark runes, than in the first centuries of use of the Latin alphabet.

Letters
The pronunciation of the names of the letters (that does not necessarily coincide with the sound it represents) is as follows:

Å, Ä and Ö
In addition to the basic twenty-six letters, A–Z, the Swedish alphabet includes Å, Ä, and Ö at the end. They are distinct letters in Swedish and are sorted after Z as shown above.

Uncommon letters
The letter Q is rare. Q was common in ordinary words before 1889, when its replacement by K was allowed. Since 1900, only the forms with K are listed in dictionaries. Some proper names kept their Q despite the change to common words: Qvist, Quist, Husqvarna, Quenby, Quinby, Quintus, Quirin and Quirinus. Other uses include some loanwords that retained Q, including queer, quisling, squash, and quilting; student terms such as gasque; and foreign geographic names like Qatar.

The letter W is rare. Before the 19th century, W was interchangeable with V (W was used in Fraktur, V in Antiqua). Official orthographic standards since 1801 use only V for common words. Many family names kept their W despite the change to common words. Foreign words and names bring in uses of W, particularly combinations with webb for (World Wide) Web. Swedish sorting traditionally and officially treated V and W as equivalent, so that users would not have to guess whether the word, or name, they were seeking was spelled with a V or a W. The two letters were often combined in the collating sequence as if they were all V or all W, until 2006 when the 13th edition of Svenska Akademiens ordlista (The Swedish Academy's Orthographic Dictionary) declared a change. W was given its own section in the dictionary, and the W = V sorting rule was deprecated. This means Swedish books printed before 2006 would group W with V in the index, and most Swedish software published before 2006 would treat the two as variations of a single character when sorting text.

The letter Z is rare, used in names and a few loanwords such as zon (zone). Z was historically pronounced /ts/. By 1700, this had merged with /s/. As a result, Z was replaced by S in 1700. Z was instead used in loanwords for historical /z/. Z is the second least used letter in Swedish, before Q.

Foreign letters
Though not in the official alphabet, á is a Swedish (old-fashioned) letter. In native Swedish personal names, ü and è and others are also used.

It is otherwise treated as a variant of y and is called a German y. In Swedish, y is a vowel and is pronounced as such (/y:/ as in ). In a few unchanged English loanwords, the y is used for the consonant /j/ as in English.

The characters à (which is used only in a few rare non-integrated loanwords such as à, from French) and é (used in some integrated loanwords like idé and armé, and in some surnames such as Rosén or Löfvén) are regarded simply as variants of a and e, respectively.

For foreign names, ç, ë, í, õ, and many others might be used, but are usually converted to c, e, i, o, etc.

Swedish newspapers and magazines have a tendency only to use letters available on the keyboard. à, ë, í, etc. are available on Swedish keyboards with a little effort, but usually not æ and ø (used in Danish and Norwegian), so they are usually replaced by ae or ä, and ö. The news agency TT follows this usage because some newspapers have no technical support for æ and ø, although there is a recommendation to use æ and ø. The letter Æ was used in earlier Swedish script systems, when there was in general more similarity between the Scandinavian languages.

The Swedish population register has traditionally only used the letters a–z, å, ä, ö, ü, é, so immigrants with other Latin letters in their names have had their diacritic marks stripped (and æ/ø converted to ä/ö), although recently more diacritics have been allowed.

The difference between the Danish/Norwegian and the Swedish alphabet is that Danish/Norwegian uses the variant Æ instead of Ä, and the variant Ø instead of Ö. Also, the collating order for these three letters is different: Æ, Ø, Å.

Handwritten cursive alphabet 

The Swedish traditional handwritten alphabet is the same as the ordinary Latin cursive alphabet, but the letters Ö and Ä are written by connecting the dots with a curved line ~, hence looking like Õ and Ã. In texted handwriting the dots should be clearly separated, but writers frequently replace them with a line: Ō, Ā.

Sound–spelling correspondences

Short vowels are followed by two or more consonants; long vowels are followed by a single consonant, by a vowel or are word-final.

The combinations  are pronounced  respectively. The  phoneme is a very common variation instead of the  phoneme (below).

Spellings for the sje-phoneme 
Due to several phonetic combinations coalescing over recent centuries, the spelling of the Swedish sje-sound is very eclectic. Some estimates claim that there are over 50 possible different spellings of the sound, though this figure is disputed. Garlén (1988) gives a list of 22 spellings, but many of them are confined to only a few words, often loanwords, and all of them can correspond to other sounds or sound sequences as well. Some spellings of the sje-sound are as follows:

  in most French loanwords, but in final position often respelled sch. English loanwords with this spelling usually use the tje-sound
  in words mainly from French, for example generös (generous) and gentil (generous, posh, stylish)
  mostly in the end of the word in many French loanwords, like garage, prestige
  in for example religiös (religious)
  in French loanwords, for example jalusi (jalousie window)
  in fascinera (fascinate)
  in all positions in many German loanwords, like schack ("chess")
  in all positions in many English loanwords
  in native Swedish words, before both front (e, i, y, ä, ö) and back vowels (a, o, u, å)
  in native Swedish words before the front vowels e, i, y, ä, ö
  in five words only, four of which are enumerated in the phrase I bara skjortan  han  in i . (In just his shirt he pushes the vehicle into the shed.) The fifth word is skjuva (shear). It is also used in an old word  (Eurasian magpie) and dialectic derivations of the same
  in three words only: västgöte, östgöte, gästgiveri. All of them are compound words: väst+göte (person from Västergötland) öst+göte (person from Östergötland) and gäst+giveri (inn)
  occurs only in the words digestion, indigestion, kongestion, suggestion, the place-name Kristianstad, and in the pronunciation of the name Christian when used about Danish kings
  in five words only, all enumerated in the phrase Det är lättare att stjäla en stjälk än att stjälpa en stjärna med stjärten. (It is easier to steal a stalk than to overturn a star with your behind.)
  for the sequence  occurs only in the place-name Växjö

See also
Swedish orthography
Swedish phonology
Swedish Dialect Alphabet
Danish orthography
Finnish orthography
German orthography
Icelandic orthography
Norwegian orthography
Runes (fuþark or futhark)
Swedish Braille

Notes

References

Latin alphabets
Alphabet